Giuseppe Amato (born Giuseppe Vasaturo; 24 August 1899 – 3 February 1964) was an Italian film producer, screenwriter and director. He produced 58 films between 1932 and 1961, and is especially known for Bicycle Thieves. 
He was born in Naples and died in Rome from a heart attack.

Selected filmography

 Five to Nil (1932)
 Three Lucky Fools (1933)
 Territorial Militia (1935)
 Those Two (1935)
 Thirty Seconds of Love (1936)
 The Man Who Smiles (1936)
 I Don't Know You Anymore (1936)
 The Castiglioni Brothers (1937)
 It Was I! (1937)
 L'amor mio non muore (1938)
 The House of Shame (1938)
 The Count of Brechard (1938)
 The Document (1939)
 Heartbeat (1939)
 Unjustified Absence (1939)
 Department Store (1939)
 Eternal Melodies (1940)
 A Romantic Adventure (1940)
 Red Roses (1940 - director) Rose scarlatte, co-directed with Vittorio De Sica
 The Jester's Supper (1942)
 Four Steps in the Clouds (1942)
 Before the Postman (1942)
 The Peddler and the Lady (1943)
 Shoeshine (also known as Shoeshine Boys) (1946)
 Rome, Open City (1945)
 Malìa (1946)
 Christmas at Camp 119 (1948)
 Yvonne la Nuit (1949)
 Paris Is Always Paris (1951)
 A Thief in Paradise (1952)
 Umberto D. (1952)
 The Return of Don Camillo (1952)
 Donne proibite (1953)
 The Last Five Minutes - Gli ultimi cinque minuti (1955)
 Move and I'll Shoot (1958)
 Arrivederci Roma (1958 - writer)
 The Facts of Murder (1959)
 La Dolce Vita (1960)

References

External links
 
 
 

1899 births
1964 deaths
Burials at Campo Verano
Italian film producers
20th-century Italian screenwriters
Italian film directors
Italian male screenwriters
20th-century Italian male writers